Patrizia Cavazzoni is the director of the U.S. Food and Drug Administration's (FDA) Center for Drug Evaluation and Research (CDER). Prior to this position she worked at Pfizer and had been a psychiatrist

Education 
Cavazzoni earned her medical degree from McGill University and subsequently was a fellow at the University of Ottawa. She then joined the University of Ottawa as an assistant professor before moving to the pharmaceutical industry, where she worked at Pfizer.

She moved to the U.S. Food and Drug Administration in 2018, and was named acting director of the U.S. Food and Drug Administration's (FDA) Center for Drug Evaluation and Research in 2020 and director in 2021. During the COVID-19 pandemic, Cavazzoni has spoken publicly about the need for science to guide policies and about the future of the Center for Drug Evaluation and Research after the COVID-19 pandemic. She also noted that she would hand Donald Trump a blank sheet of paper if asked to submit a list of workers who should not receive due process protections.

Research 
While she worked at the Royal Ottawa Hospital, Cavazzoni examined the link between genetics and personality, and the chemicals implicated in brain chemistry. She further examined the connections between diabetes and patients receiving antipsychotic medications.

Selected publications

Honors and awards 
Cavazzoni received the American College of Psychiatrists's Laughlin Fellowship.

References 

Living people
McGill University alumni
Women physicians
Food and Drug Administration people
Year of birth missing (living people)